Tucks Reef is a small rocky island, with an area of 1.14 ha, in south-eastern Australia.  It is part of Tasmania’s Vansittart Island Group, lying in eastern Bass Strait between Flinders and Cape Barren Islands in the Furneaux Group.

Fauna
Recorded breeding seabird and wader species are little penguin, white-faced storm-petrel, silver gull, pied oystercatcher and sooty oystercatcher.

References

Furneaux Group